Marc Ferrez (December 7, 1843 – January 12, 1923) was a Brazilian photographer born in Rio de Janeiro.

Marc Ferrez was the son of the French sculptor and engraver Zepherin Ferrez who moved to Rio de Janeiro in 1816. Marc Ferrez was born in Rio de Janeiro, Brazil. He studied in Paris then came back to Rio as an apprentice to photographer Franz Keller of Germany. In 1865, Ferrez opened his own photography studio where he primarily focused of landscapes and Brazilian nature. His work became so popular that Emperor Dom Pedro II gave him funds to support his art, allowing Ferrez to explore every angle that the camera had to offer. Just eight years after its opening, in 1873, his studio burned down. He returned to France to purchase a new camera, opting for one that had the capability of taking panoramic photos. This was a view of photography that was still in its infancy. When he finally returned to Rio de Janeiro, he focused on rural landscapes and slaves working on the plantations. From 1875 to 1876 Ferrez joined American Charles Frederick Hartt on a geological and geographic expedition to the inner province of Bahia. It was during this trip Ferrez took pictures of indigenous Botocudo tribe, and used the panorama and became the master of it.

Ferrez's life was dedicated to the art of photography and he is considered one of the greatest photographers of his time. His production was massive, and his photographs document the consolidation of Brazil as a nation and Rio de Janeiro as a metropolis. Emperor Pedro II declared Ferrez the "photographer of the Royal Navy", because of his superior skill of neutralizing the ships movements. In 1876, he entered his photos into an exhibition, with an ethnological interest, called Exhibition of the Century in Pennsylvania. He won a gold medal. In 1882 he won in the South American Continental Exhibition in Buenos Aires. In 1904, he entered his material into the world fair in St. Louis. He was the only photographer to win a gold medal. In 1907, he opened his own picture house in Rio de Janeiro, Pathé Cinema. It was here that he tried out new technology that enhanced the field of photography. During the end of his life he focused more on photographing architecture and street scenes in Rio de Janeiro. Ferrez's most popular works were of Brazilian landscapes. Natural features: mountains, waterfalls, jungles. Man-made engineering, railroads, bridges, and urban buildings. Ferrez is considered by photography historians to be a master at his craft; his work is on the same level as famous photographers William Henry Jackson and Eadweard Muybridge.

He photographed Brazil from south to north, but paid more attention to his home city, Rio de Janeiro. His masterpieces are the great albums of railway constructions and the great panoramic views of the city of Rio de Janeiro and its development.

Ferrez died in 1923 and left thousands of pictures and reproductions of his works.

References

External links 
 Marc Ferrez photographs of Avenida Central from the CCA Collection
 http://www.getty.edu/art/collection/artists/1439/marc-ferrez-brazilian-1843-1923/
 http://www.oxfordartonline.com/subscriber/article/grove/art/T028051

1843 births
1923 deaths
Brazilian photographers
Brazilian people of French descent